Matt Furstenburg (born June 19, 1989) is a former American football tight end. He played college football at the University of Maryland. He signed as an undrafted free agent with the Baltimore Ravens in 2014.

Early years
He was a two-sport athlete in Flemington, New Jersey. He helped his high-school football team win a state title  as an all-state tight end and defensive lineman in which he recorded 400 receiving yards and eight sacks during high school.

Professional career

On April 27, 2013, Furstenburg signed with the Baltimore Ravens as an undrafted free agent. He was waived on August 30, 2013.  
Furstenburg spent time on the practice squad during the 2013 season.  He was released by the Ravens in May 2014 as part of roster moves made after the 2014 NFL Draft.

After football
After his short stint in the NFL, Fustenburg became a co-founder and one of the original inventors of Grip Boost, a gel product with the purpose of restoring the tackiness of sports gloves. In 2018, Grip Boost football gloves were ranked the best football gloves with the #1 grip in football.

References

External links
Grip Boost bio
Maryland Terrapins bio

Further reading

1989 births
Living people
People from Flemington, New Jersey
Players of American football from New Jersey
American football tight ends
Maryland Terrapins football players
Baltimore Ravens players